Oranges Are Not the Only Fruit is a novel by Jeanette Winterson published in 1985 by Pandora Press. It is a coming-of-age story about a sapphic who grows up in an English Pentecostal community. Key themes of the book include transition from youth to adulthood, complex family relationships, same-sex relationships, organised religion and the concept of faith.

It has been included on both GCSE and A-Level reading lists for education in England and Wales, and was adapted by Winterson into a BAFTA-winning 1990 BBC television drama serial of the same name.

Background
The book is semi-autobiographical and is based on Winterson's life growing up in Accrington, Lancashire. "I wrote about some of these things in Oranges, and when it was published, my mother sent me a furious note".  A parallel non-fictional account of her life at this time is given in her 2011 memoir, Why Be Happy When You Could Be Normal? Although the protagonist of Oranges bears the author's first name, John Mullan has argued that it is neither an autobiography nor a memoir, but a Künstlerroman.

Premise
The main character is a young girl named Jeanette, who is adopted by evangelists from the Elim Pentecostal Church. She believes she is destined to become a missionary. The book depicts religious enthusiasm as an exploration of the power of love. As an adolescent, Jeanette finds herself attracted to another girl, and her mother's group of religious friends subject her and her partner to exorcisms.

Allusions to other works
The novel is divided into eight sections, each of which is named after one of the first eight books of the Bible (Genesis, Exodus, Leviticus, Numbers, Deuteronomy, Joshua, Judges, and Ruth.) Each chapter often contains references and allusions to their corresponding book in the Bible.

The novel also contains references to numerous other literary works, historical figures and aspects of popular culture: 
Jeanette's mother frequently lauds the good and moral behaviour of the titular character in Jane Eyre, by Charlotte Bronte.
Jeanette compares her mother to William Blake. 
Jeanette's great-uncle is described as a stage-actor, who at least once performed as Hamlet to favourable reviews.
The owner of the local pest-control shop, Mrs. Arkwright, shares the same name with the similarly miserly owner of the local grocery shop in Open All Hours, a popular BBC sitcom that originally ran from 1976-1985. 
Jeanette's mother is subscribed to the religious magazine The Plain Truth, which was issued monthly by The Worldwide Church of God from 1934 to 1986. In the novel the family receive a weekly subscription. 
Whilst visiting Jeanette in hospital, Elsie reads "Goblin Market" by Christina Rossetti, and poems by William Butler Yeats, including 'Lapis Lazuli'.
Jeanette and her mother see The Ten Commandments, starring Charlton Heston, at the cinema.
For her Easter-Egg painting competition entry, Jeanette paints her eggs as characters from Wagner's opera-cycle The Ring of the Nibelung, including the Germanic heroine Brunhilda. 
She also creates artworks based on the 1942 film Now, Voyager, and the Tennessee Williams play A Streetcar Named Desire.
At her local library, Jeanette reads a version of the French fairy tale Beauty and the Beast. 
Jeannette's mother is shown to be a fan of country and gospel singer Johnny Cash. 
In her new oversized raincoat Jeannette is reminded of seeing The Man in the Iron Mask - although which film version remains unspecified.
Feelings of misery remind Jeanette of the poet John Keats.
The short, abstract section entitled 'Deuteronomy' alludes to The Legend of Atlantis, the mythical city of El Dorado, Saint George and the Second World War. 
Later in the novel, a confused Jeanette dreams of a library where a number of young women are shown to be translating the epic Old-English poem Beowulf.
Toward the close of the novel, Jeanette is depicted on a train reading George Eliot's Middlemarch.

The novel is interspersed with short stories that bear many resemblances to (and draw influences from) traditional Biblical stories of the Old Testament, tales of Arthurian Legend (specifically related to Thomas Malory's Le Morte d'Arthur) and other popular fairy tales.

Reception
The novel won Winterson the Whitbread Award for a First Novel in 1985.

Although it is sometimes referred to as a "lesbian novel", Winterson has objected to this label, arguing, "I've never understood why straight fiction is supposed to be for everyone, but anything with a gay character or that includes gay experience is only for queers".

Adaptations
A television adaptation of the book was made and aired by the BBC in 1990, starring Charlotte Coleman and Geraldine McEwan, which won the Prix Italia in 1991.

The book was released on cassette by BBC Audiobooks in 1990, also read by Coleman.

A two-part dramatisation, adapted by Winterson and starring Lesley Sharp, was broadcast on BBC Radio 4 in April 2016.

Legacy
The novel has been included on both GCSE and A-Level reading lists for education in England and Wales, including the OCR English Literature A-Level module "Literature Post-1900".

References

Further reading
 Bentley, Nick. "Jeanette Winterson, Oranges Are Not The Only Fruit". In Contemporary British Fiction (Edinburgh: Edinburgh University Press, 2008), 108–117. .

1985 British novels
Costa Book Award-winning works
Roman à clef novels
1980s LGBT novels
Novels by Jeanette Winterson
British bildungsromans
Elim Pentecostal Church
Prix Italia winners
Novels set in Lancashire
Novels with lesbian themes
British novels adapted into television shows
Novels adapted into radio programs
Accrington
1985 debut novels